The 2017 OFC U-17 Championship was the 17th edition of the OFC U-17 Championship, the biennial international youth football tournament organized by the Oceania Football Confederation (OFC) for players aged 17 and below. The tournament was held in Tahiti between 11 and 24 February 2017.

In March 2015, FIFA decided that the OFC gets two slots at every FIFA U-20 and U-17 World Cup. So the top two teams qualified for the 2017 FIFA U-17 World Cup in India.

Format
The qualification structure is as follows:
First round: American Samoa, Cook Islands, Samoa and Tonga played a round-robin tournament in Samoa. The winner qualified for the tournament.
Tournament (2017 OFC U-17 Championship): A total of eight teams (Fiji, New Caledonia, New Zealand, Papua New Guinea, Solomon Islands, Tahiti, Vanuatu, and the first round winner) played the tournament in Tahiti. For the group stage, they were divided into two groups of four teams. The top two teams of each group advanced to the knockout stage (semi-finals and final) to decide the winner of the 2017 OFC U-17 Championship and the two teams that qualified for the 2017 FIFA U-17 World Cup.

Teams
All 11 FIFA-affiliated national teams from the OFC entered qualification. It is only the third time all 11 OFC member associations have entered an Oceania competition since 2006.

Squads

Venues
The final round of the tournament were played in two venues in Tahiti.

Match officials

Referees

 Salesh Chand
 Médéric Lacour
 Matt Conger
 Nelson Sogo
 Hamilton Siau
 George Time
 Norbert Hauata
 Kader Zitouni
 Roger Adams
 Arnold Tari

Assistant Referees

 John Pareanga
 Noah Kusunan
 Tevita Makasini
 Folio Moeaki
 Sione Teu
 Marc Sinyeue
 Gareth Sheehan
 Wase Bafinu
 Malaetala Sofe
 Denson Sale

First round
The preliminary tournament was hosted by Samoa between 2 and 8 July 2016. Due to unforeseen circumstances, matchday one was postponed from 2 to 4 July, and matchday 2 was postponed from 5 to 6 July. The winner qualified for the final tournament.

All times are local, WST (UTC+13).

Second round
The final tournament was scheduled for 11–24 February 2017 (originally 15–29 January 2017). Tahiti were announced as the host in December 2015.

The draw was held on 18 July 2016. The eight teams were drawn into two groups of four teams. There was no seeding, except that hosts Tahiti were assigned to position A1 in the draw. The top two teams of each group advanced to the semi-finals.

All times are local, TAHT (UTC−10).

Group A

Group A matches of matchday 3 were moved from Stade Mahina, Mahina to Stade Pater, Pirae due to adverse weather conditions.

Group B

Knockout stage

Bracket

Semi-finals
Winners qualified for 2017 FIFA U-17 World Cup.

Final

Goalscorers
7 goals

 Charles Spragg

5 goals

 Junior Kaoni

4 goals

 Barthy Kerobin
 Max Mata
 Matthew Palmer

3 goals

 Conroy Tiputoa
 Ratu Dau
 Paul Gope-Fenepej
 Junior Allen
 Ali Mekawir

2 goals

 Kimiora Ngametua
 Bernard Iwa
 Matthew Jones
 Elijah Just
 Oliver Whyte
 Willie Sauiluma
 Dilo Tumua
 Don Keana
 Steward Toata
 Tevita Kau
 Dilland Ngwele

1 goal

 Takai Pouli
 Semi Matalau
 Pierre Bako
 Robert Caihe
 Abiezer Jeno
 Vita Longue
 Lionel Thahnaena
 Liberato Cacace
 Matthew Conroy
 Willem Ebbinge
 Kingsley Sinclair
 Jake Williams
 Jonathan Allen
 Kimson Kapai
 Aben Pukue
 Emmanuel Simongi
 Lotial Mano
 Osa Savelio
 Elis Mana
 Kalahani Beaumert
 Eddy Kaspard
 Yann Vivi
 Kalakaua Faivailo
 Ofa Kite
 Petueli Tokotaha
 Zidane Maguekon
 Rhydley Napau
 Jayson Tari

1 own goal

 Aben Pukue (playing against New Zealand)
 Pesamino Tomasi (playing against Cook Islands)

Awards
The Golden Ball Award is awarded to the most outstanding player of the tournament. The Golden Glove Award is awarded to the best goalkeeper of the tournament. The Golden Boot Award is awarded to the top scorer of the tournament. The Fair Play Award is awarded to the team with the best disciplinary record at the tournament.

Qualified teams for FIFA U-17 World Cup
The following two teams from OFC qualified for the 2017 FIFA U-17 World Cup.

1 Bold indicates champion for that year. Italic indicates host for that year.

References

External links
2017 OFC U-17 Championship, oceaniafootball.com
Results

 
2017
2016–17 in OFC football
2017 in French Polynesian sport
2017 Ofc U-17 Championship
February 2017 sports events in Oceania